The Avenue J station is a local station on the BMT Brighton Line of the New York City Subway, located on Avenue J between East 15th and East 16th Streets in Midwood, Brooklyn. The station is served by the Q train at all times.

History 
The station was opened around 1900 as a two-track surface station and named Manhattan Terrace. It was renamed "Avenue J" in 1907, the same year the railroad line was grade separated. Vestiges of the spur built to reconnect the Brighton Line and Long Island Rail Road's Bay Ridge Branch after grade separation still exist to this day.

This station underwent reconstruction from September 2009 to December 2011. Both platforms were rebuilt with new windscreens, canopies, and tactile strip edges. A temporary platform over the express tracks was used to provide service on the side that was under rebuilding.  The new windscreens were controversial with nearby community members, since the windscreens contained gaps that allowed trash and noise through while causing privacy issues for residents whose backyards faced the station.

Station layout

The station is located on a raised earthen embankment. There are four tracks and two side platforms. The two center tracks are used by the B express train on weekdays.

The 2011 artwork here is called Bird Laid Bare by Rita MacDonald. It consists of murals and mosaics on the walls of the Coney Island-bound platform's main staircase depicting various species of birds.

Exits
The station's main house is located underneath the right-of-way on the south side of Avenue J and has a full-time turnstile bank and token booth. There is a double-wide staircase facing north going up to the Coney Island-bound platform and one narrow staircase facing south going up to the Manhattan-bound platform. The Coney Island-bound staircase's landing has two exit-only turnstiles leading directly to the street.

Both platforms have an unstaffed bank of turnstiles leading to a staircase that goes down to the north side of Avenue J. The Coney Island-bound one is double-wide.

Gallery

See also 

 Manhattan Beach Branch
 Bay Ridge Branch

References

External links 
 
 Station Reporter — Q Train
 Art's Archives — Manhattan Beach Branch     (Original photos of the Manhattan Terrace station, signal houses and track diagrams of the LIRR connection)
 The Subway Nut — Avenue J Pictures 
 Avenue J entrance from Google Maps Street View
 Platforms from Google Maps Street View

J
New York City Subway stations in Brooklyn
Railway stations in the United States opened in 1908
1908 establishments in New York City
Midwood, Brooklyn